Beutner is a surname. Notable people with the surname include:

Austin Beutner (born 1960), American businessman, civic leader, and philanthropist
Ernst H. Beutner (1923–2013), German-born microbiologist
Katharine Beutner (born 1982), American novelist, essayist, and academic

See also
Beutler